Gallupville Methodist Church is a historic Methodist church in Gallupville, Schoharie County, New York.  The original Greek Revival style church structure is a three-by-three-bay, plain frame structure with a small, single-story rear wing built about 1844.  In 1896, a central Romanesque style two stage, engaged entry / bell tower was added.

It was listed on the National Register of Historic Places in 2001, but additional information has yet to be digitized.

References

Methodist churches in New York (state)
Churches on the National Register of Historic Places in New York (state)
Greek Revival church buildings in New York (state)
Romanesque Revival architecture in New York (state)
Churches completed in 1844
19th-century Methodist church buildings in the United States
Churches in Schoharie County, New York
National Register of Historic Places in Schoharie County, New York